The Policía de la Provincia de Córdoba (Córdoba Provincial Police; PPC) is an Argentine police agency, responsible for policing the Córdoba province.85

See also
Argentine Federal Police
Buenos Aires (province) Police
Santa Fe Province Police
Buenos Aires (city) Urban Guard
Interior Security System

References

External links
Official website 

Provincial law enforcement agencies of Argentina